Bourneau is a commune in the Vendée department in the Pays de la Loire region in western France.

Geography
The river Smagne has its source in the commune.

See also
Communes of the Vendée department

References

Communes of Vendée